This is the discography of the American band For Real.

Albums

Studio albums

Singles

References

Discographies of American artists